Segarelli is an Italian surname. Notable people with the surname include:

Francesca Segarelli (born 1990), Dominican Republic tennis player
Gerard Segarelli (died 1300), Italian Christian religious leader
Gianluca Segarelli (born 1978), Italian footballer

Italian-language surnames